Ariel Audrey Young (born August 30, 2001) is a Canadian soccer player who currently plays as a defender for the UCF Knights. In 2017, she earned a cap with the Canada national team.

Early life 
Young began playing youth soccer with Ottawa South United at age seven. She was named to the Ontario provincial team at age 13, and joined the Ottawa Fury Academy at U15 level. In 2017, at age 15, she played for U18 Team Ontario at the 2017 Canada Summer Games. She then moved to the Ontario REX program in 2018, where she played for six months. In August 2018, she joined the Vancouver Whitecaps REX program.

College career 
In November 2018, Young committed to the University of Central Florida to play for the women's soccer team beginning in September 2019. Ultimately, she redshirted her first two seasons and began playing for the team in 2021. She scored her first collegiate goal on September 9, 2021 against the Ole Miss Rebels. In October 2021, she earned AAC Rookie of the Week honours. After her first season, she was a unanimous selection to the AAC All-Rookie Team.

International career 
In February 2017, she made her debut in the Canadian youth program, attending a camp with the Canada U17 team. In July 2017, she played with the U17s at the Four Nations tournament in China, scoring a goal in a 1-1 draw against the United States U17. 

In November 2017, she was called up to the Canada senior team, making her debut on November 12 in a 3–1 defeat to the United States in a friendly at age 16.

She was named to the roster for the 2018 CONCACAF Women's U-17 Championship, where she won a bronze medal, and the 2018 FIFA U-17 Women's World Cup, finishing in fourth. She also played with the Canada U20 at the 2018 CONCACAF Women's U-20 Championship.

References

External links

2001 births
Living people
Canadian women's soccer players
Women's association football defenders
Canada women's international soccer players
Soccer people from Ontario
People from Bruce County
Ottawa South United players
Canadian expatriate soccer players
Canadian expatriate sportspeople in the United States
Expatriate women's soccer players in the United States
UCF Knights women's soccer players